Kim Jan-Di (Korean: 김잔디; born 15 June 1991 in South Jeolla, South Korea) is a South Korean judoka. She competed in the 57 kg event at the 2012 Summer Olympics and lost in the second round. She lost in the first round of the same event at the 2016 Summer Olympics.  That year, she won a silver medal at the Asian Championships.  She was ranked 3rd in the world for part of 2016.

Her other medals include silver at the 2011 and 2013 Asian Championships, and the 2010 and 2014 Asian Games and bronze at the 2012 and 2015 Asian Championships.

Competitive record

(as of 19 February 2016)

References

External links
 
 

1991 births
Living people
People from Boseong County
South Korean female judoka
Judoka at the 2012 Summer Olympics
Judoka at the 2016 Summer Olympics
Olympic judoka of South Korea
Judoka at the 2010 Asian Games
Judoka at the 2014 Asian Games
Judoka at the 2018 Asian Games
Asian Games silver medalists for South Korea
Asian Games bronze medalists for South Korea
Asian Games medalists in judo
Medalists at the 2010 Asian Games
Medalists at the 2014 Asian Games
Universiade medalists in judo
Universiade silver medalists for South Korea
Medalists at the 2011 Summer Universiade
Medalists at the 2015 Summer Universiade
Sportspeople from South Jeolla Province
21st-century South Korean women